Belišće is a town in Croatia, located in the region of Slavonia, Osijek-Baranja County, at the altitude of 93 m. The population of the town is 6,518 (2011), with 10,825 in the municipality. In 2011 census, the majority were Croats. This industrial town upon the Drava river lies near the border with Hungary north from here.

Chief occupations are forestry, timber and wood processing, (sawmill, chemical and mechanical wood processing), corrugated fiberboard, metal industry, chemicals and synthetic material processing.

The influential Gutmann family made a significant impact on the Belišće region in the 19th and 20th century. Once vast Slavonian oak forests were mostly replaced with farmland, and a section of the working-class quarters of Salamon H. Gutmann from 1884 became part of the present-day Belišće.

Major recreational activities include angling, rowing kayak and canoe on the Drava river and its backwaters and hunting in the broader surroundings.

The settlements in the administrative area are:
 Belišće, population 6,518
 Bistrinci, population 1,598
 Bocanjevci, population 457
 Gat, population 705
 Gorica Valpovačka, population 165
 Kitišanci, population 150
 Tiborjanci, population 291
 Veliškovci, population 685
 Vinogradci, population 256

See also
 Edmund Gutmann
 Viktor Gutmann

References

External links

Official site

Slavonia
Cities and towns in Croatia
Municipalities of Osijek-Baranja County
1884 establishments in Croatia